San Lorenzo is the Italian and Spanish name for Saint Lawrence, the 3rd-century Christian martyr, and may refer to:

Places

Argentina 
 San Lorenzo, Santa Fe
 San Lorenzo Department, Chaco
 Monte San Lorenzo, a mountain on the border between Argentina and Chile

Bolivia 
 San Lorenzo, Tarija

Colombia 
 San Lorenzo, Nariño

Croatia 
 Lovrečica, also called San Lorenzo, a village in Umag

Costa Rica 
 San Lorenzo, a district in Heredia Province

Dominican Republic 
 San Lorenzo de Mao in Mao, Dominican Republic

Ecuador 
 San Lorenzo, Ecuador, a sea port
 San Lorenzo Canton, Esmeraldas Province

El Salvador 
 San Lorenzo, Ahuachapán
 San Lorenzo, San Vicente

France 
 San-Lorenzo, a village in Corsica

Guatemala 
 San Lorenzo, San Marcos
 San Lorenzo, Suchitepéquez

Honduras 
 San Lorenzo, Valle

Italy 
San Lorenzo, Arcidosso, a village in the province of Grosseto
San Lorenzo (Naples), a neighborhood in central Naples
San Lorenzo, Calabria, a municipality in the province of Reggio Calabria
San Lorenzo alle Corti, a village in the province of Pisa
San Lorenzo al Mare, a municipality in the province of Imperia
San Lorenzo a Pagnatico, a village in the province of Pisa
San Lorenzo del Vallo, a municipality in the province of Cosenza
San Lorenzo in Banale, a municipality in Trentino
San Lorenzo in Campo, a municipality in the province of Pesaro and Urbino
San Lorenzo (Bognanco), in the province of Verbano Cusio Ossola
Colonne di San Lorenzo, Roman ruins in Milan
Quartiere San Lorenzo, part of the Third Municipality of Rome
San Lorenzo Bellizzi, a municipality in Cosenza
San Lorenzo Isontino, a municipality in Gorizia
San Lorenzo Maggiore, a municipality and town in Benevento
San Lorenzo Nuovo, a municipality in Viterbo
St. Lorenzen, a municipality in South Tyrol, in the Italian region Trentino-Alto Adige/Südtirol

Mexico 
 San Lorenzo River (Mexico)
 San Lorenzo, Chihuahua
 San Lorenzo, Oaxaca
 San Lorenzo Albarradas, Oaxaca
 San Lorenzo Cacaotepec, Oaxaca
 San Lorenzo Cuaunecuiltitla, Oaxaca
 San Lorenzo Texmelucan, Oaxaca
 San Lorenzo Victoria, Oaxaca
 San Lorenzo Tenochtitlán, an ancient center of the Olmec culture, in Veracruz

Nicaragua 
 San Lorenzo, Boaco

Panama 
Fort San Lorenzo, Colón
San Lorenzo, Chiriquí

Paraguay 
 San Lorenzo, Paraguay, a satellite city to the east of Asunción

Peru 
 San Lorenzo Island, Peru, an island in the Pacific off the coast of Callao
 San Lorenzo, Loreto
 San Lorenzo, San Lorenzo District, Jauja Province
San Lorenzo District, Jauja

Philippines 
 San Lorenzo, Guimaras
 San Lorenzo, San Pablo
 San Lorenzo, a village in Makati

Puerto Rico
 San Lorenzo, Puerto Rico, a municipio
 San Lorenzo, Morovis, Puerto Rico, a barrio
 San Lorenzo barrio-pueblo, barrio and administrative center of San Lorenzo, Puerto Rico

Spain 
 San Lorenzo de El Escorial, a municipality in Madrid
 Mount San Lorenzo, a mountain near Ezcaray in Sierra de la Demanda, La Rioja
 San Lorenzo (Madrid Metro), a station on Line 4

United States 
 San Lorenzo, California, a town in Alameda County
 San Lorenzo River, in California
 San Lorenzo Valley, in California
 San Lorenzo, New Mexico (disambiguation), several unincorporated communities

Fictional 
 San Lorenzo (Vonnegut), a Caribbean island nation in Cat's Cradle by Kurt Vonnegut
 San Lorenzo, a Central American country in Hey Arnold!: The Jungle Movie
 San Lorenzo, a Mediterranean country in Leverage
 San Lorenzo, a town in The Adventures of Puss in Boots

Churches 
 Basilica di San Lorenzo (disambiguation)

Italy 
 San Lorenzo Church, Brescia, a Baroque style, Roman Catholic church in Lombardy
 San Lorenzo, Budrio, a Roman Catholic parish church in Bologna, Emilia Romagna
 San Lorenzo, Carmignano, a romanesque-style, Roman Catholic rural parish church in Prato, Tuscany
 San Lorenzo, Civitella del Tronto, a Renaissance-style Roman Catholic parish church in Teramo, Abruzzo
 San Lorenzo, Florence, one of the largest churches of Florence
 San Lorenzo, Ghisalba, a neoclassical-style, Roman Catholic parish church in Bergamo, Lombardy
 San Lorenzo, Lodi, a Romanesque-style, Roman Catholic church located in Lodi, region of Lombardy
 San Lorenzo, Melfi, a Baroque-style Roman Catholic church building in Potenza, Basilicata
 San Lorenzo, Mortara, a Gothic architecture, Roman Catholic Basilica church in Pavia, Lombardy
 San Lorenzo, Nirano, a Roman Catholic parish church in Fiorano Modenese, Emilia-Romagna
 San Lorenzo, Pazzaglio ed Uniti, a Roman Catholic parish church in Cremona, Lombardy
 San Lorenzo, San Lorenzo in Campo, a Roman Catholic basilica church in Pesaro e Urbino, Marche
 San Lorenzo, Sansepolcro, a Renaissance-style, Roman Catholic church in Arezzo, Tuscany
 San Lorenzo, Turin, a Baroque-style church in Turin
 San Lorenzo, Venice, a church building in the sestiere of Castello of Venice
 San Lorenzo in Panisperna, a basilica in Rome
 San Lorenzo in Lucina, a church in Rome
 San Lorenzo in Miranda, a church and former temple in Rome
 San Lorenzo fuori le Mura, a basilica in Rome
 Genoa Cathedral or Cattedrale di San Lorenzo, a cathedral in Genoa
 Perugia Cathedral or Cattedrale di San Lorenzo, a cathedral in Perugia
 Basilica of San Lorenzo, Milan or Chiesa di San Lorenzo Maggiore, a church in Milan

Spain 
 San Lorenzo, Córdoba, a church in Andalusia
 Iglesia de San Lorenzo, Toledo

Sports 
 San Lorenzo de Almagro, an Argentine football club based in Buenos Aires
 Club Sportivo San Lorenzo, a Paraguayan football club
 San Lorenzo F.C., a Honduran football club

Other uses 
 San Lorenzo (restaurant), an Italian restaurant in London
 San Lorenzo (Vonnegut), a fictional country in the novel Cat's Cradle by Kurt Vonnegut
 Sanlorenzo, an Italian yacht builder
 Battle of San Lorenzo, fought in 1813 between the United Provinces and the Royalists, in current Argentine territory
 Battle of San Lorenzo de la Muga, fought in 1784 between Spanish-Portuguese and French armies
 Operación San Lorenzo, a rescue of trapped Chilean miners in 2010
 "San Lorenzo march", a 1902 Argentine military march, celebrating the Battle of San Lorenzo
 "San Lorenzo", a song by Pat Metheny Group from Pat Metheny Group
 San Lorenzo Troop, a mounted squadron of the ceremonial Regiment of Mounted Grenadiers of the Argentine Army

See also 

 
 
 Lorenzo (disambiguation)
 San Lorenzo District (disambiguation)
 Río San Lorenzo (disambiguation)
 Saint Laurent (disambiguation)
 Saint Lawrence (disambiguation)
 San Lawrenz, a village in Gozo, Malta
 Sankt Lorenzen (disambiguation)
 São Lourenço (disambiguation)